Clostridium algifaecis  is a Gram-positive and rod-shaped bacterium from the genus Clostridium which has been isolated from decomposing algal scum from the Lake Taihu in China.

References

 

Bacteria described in 2014
algifaecis